State Road 47 in the U.S. state of Indiana is a state highway in west-central and central Indiana. Although State Road 47 is signed as a north–south highway, it runs more east–west.

Route description
The southern terminus of State Road 47 is at U.S. Route 41 just west of Turkey Run State Park.  Its northern terminus is in Sheridan at State Road 38.  
State Road 47 rolls gently through the farmland in Boone and eastern Montgomery Counties. In western Montgomery and Parke Counties, segments of the road contain moderate hills and curves, especially near Turkey Run State Park.

History
State Road 47's initial segment ran northeast from U.S. Route 41 to Crawfordsville. The next segment ran east from Crawfordsville through Sheridan to U.S. Route 31. The portion of State Road 47 between Sheridan and U.S. Route 31 was later decommissioned.

Major intersections

References

External links

047
Transportation in Boone County, Indiana
Transportation in Montgomery County, Indiana
Transportation in Parke County, Indiana
Transportation in Hamilton County, Indiana